"Omen" is a single released by Orbital. This single was released in the UK on 11 September 1990. This is the follow up to their debut single "Chime".

Other tracks on the single are the Deeper remix "2 Deep" and "Open Mind".
Early printings of the album had "Omen 7" mix" as track 2, mislabeled "2 Deep" on the tracklist. Later printings actually include 2 Deep.

Remixes
All 4 singles off the first Orbital album had remix singles as well. "Omen Remixes" had 4 remixes of the title song, labeled "Omen (The Chariot)", "Omen (The Tower)", "Omen (Wheel of Fortune)", and "Omen (The Fall)".

Samples

Omen samples "Song to the Siren" from This Mortal Coil and "(How to Be A) Millionaire" by ABC.

Artwork

The record sleeve was designed by the usual Orbital collaborator Gavin Fultano (Fultano 90) with photography by Sally Harding and computerised by Chris Smith. The sleeve features a clasping hand in what looks like a heat map.

References

1990 songs
Orbital (band) songs
Songs written by Paul Hartnoll